Kitiyakara Voralaksana, 1st Prince of Chanthaburi (8 June 1874 – 27 May 1931) was a Prince of Siam, a member of the Siamese Royal Family (later Thailand). He originated the House of Kitiyakara. His descendants use this royal surname. He is the paternal grandfather of Queen Sirikit, consort of King Bhumibol Adulyadej (Rama IX of Thailand). Through Sirikit he is also the maternal great-grandfather of King Maha Vajiralongkorn (Rama X), who has been King of Thailand since 2016.

Biography

Prince Kitiyakara Voralaksana was born at Grand Palace, Bangkok. He was the 12th child of King Chulalongkorn, Rama V of Siam, and Chao Chom Manda Uam. His maternal grandfather was a prominent Thai Chinese businessman who initiated the creation of the Khlong Phasi Charoen. He attended primary school at Suankularb Wittayalai School, Bangkok. In 1885, he went to the United Kingdom, to study Oriental Studies, Pali and Sanskrit at Balliol College, Oxford. He went to study abroad with three of his half-brothers:
 Prince Raphi Phatthanasak, Prince of Ratchaburi
 Prince Pravitra Vadhanodom, Prince of Prachinburi
 Prince Chirapravati Voradej, Prince of Nakhon Chaisi

After returning to Bangkok, he worked in the Office of the Royal Secretariat and Education Office (later Ministry of Education). On 26 April 1902, his father gave him the royal title as Prince of Chanthaburi, translated as Krom Muen Chunthaburi Naruenat (the fifth level of the Krom ranks. He had used this title until his father's death. His royal title was elevated from Krom Muen into Krom Phra, the second level of the Krom ranks by his half-brother, King Vajiravudh (Rama VI)

Royal duties
He had worked at the Royal Secretariat office once he had come back to Siam in 1894 before becoming the director general of Education Department, ministry of education before being transferred to Comptoller General Department, minitry of finance in 1902 due to the diploma on accountant while studying in  Balliol College, Oxford University. He later become an acting minister of finance in 1907 after resignation of Phraya Suriyanuwat (Koed Bunnag) due to endless conflicts with other ministers in the cabinet and the tax collectors. He had become officially minister of finance on 1 April 1908 due to his compentency to handle the affairs in Ministry of Finance which successfully paved the way for Siamese Baht to be in Gold Standard on 11 November 1908.

He established the Saving Office (now  Government Saving Bank) on 1 April 1913 for common people, savings and deposit to avoid any dangers; like thieves, fires, etc. He promoted saving money to all the people, and he established the Department of Commerce and statistics management service. He outlined the legal regulation of customs, and updated the ministries of revenue and taxation. Then were collected all the levy offices in the one department, in the control of this ministry. Moreover, he provided laws of alcohol and opium control into a government monopoly, thus paving the way for the future ability to enforce the government's opium ban.

In 1920, he became minister of commerce, according with his excellent ability in commerce and economics. However, he had to step down from minister of finance due to the heavy workloads on both ministries, especially the financial deficits during 1920's.

In the reign of King Prajadhipok (Rama VII), he became a member of the Supreme Council of State of Siam on 27 November 1925, with his uncles, and his half-brother, including
 Prince Bhanurangsi Savangwongse, the Prince Bhanubandhu Vongsevoradej
 Prince Chitcharoen, the Prince Narisara Nuvadtivongs
 Prince Disuankumarn, the Prince Damrong Rajanubhab
 Prince Paribatra Sukhumbandhu, the Prince of Nakhon Sawan

Moreover, he also worked as the committee of Siamese Royal Institute. He translated the novel Chandrakumarn Chadok from Pali into a Thai version. He created the Pali-Thai-Sanskrit-English Glossary, by using references from the Pali dictionary of R.C. Childers. Later the Pali Pakorn Association published this as the primary edition of dictionary, as the original had not been clearly done. Later, in the reign of King Bhumibol Adulyadej (Rama IX) gave the responsibility of restoring the original edition to Mom Luang Chirayu Navawongs, member of the Privy Council, joining with the Maha Mongkut Royal College Foundation. This new edition was established, published and now has become widely well-known.

Later life

In his later life, he went to Paris, France, to have his illnesses (Laryngeal cancer) treated. But he died there peacefully on 27 May 1931. Later, the Minister of Commerce built his statue and erected it to stand in front of the Commerce Ministry building. And the statue can be seen there, still standing today. This is in remembrance of the fact that he was the first Minister of Commerce of Siam, and all he did to protect the savings of common people in Thailand. 

The official residence of the House of Kitiyakara is Dheves Palace, Bangkok. His descendants continue to live in this palace today.

Marriage and issue
Prince Kitiyakara Voralaksana, the Prince of Chunthaburi had 5 consorts, with 24 children; 14 sons and 10 daughters.
 Mom Chao Absornsamarn Dhevakul, daughter of Prince Devan Udayavonsge, the Prince Dhevavongse Varoprakarn; had 6 sons and 6 daughters

 Jon Vijayabhai (later Mom Jon Kitiyakara na Ayudhya); had 2 sons and 2 daughters

 La-ong Vijarnbutra (later Mom La-ong Kitiyakara na Ayudhya); had 2 sons

 Jun Intaketu (later Mom Jun Kitiyakara na Ayudhya); had 2 sons and a daughter

 Lamiet Plianprayul (later Mom Lamiet Kitiyakara na Ayudhya); had a son and 2 daughters

Royal Decorations
Prince Kitiyakara Voralaksana received the following decorations in the Honours System of Thailand (then Siam):
  Knight of The Ancient and Auspicious Order of the Nine Gems
  Knight of The Most Illustrious Order of the Royal House of Chakri
  Knight Grand Cordon (Special Class) of The Most Illustrious Order of Chula Chom Klao
  Knight Grand Commander (Senangapati) of the Honourable of the Order of Rama (1st class)
  Knight Grand Cordon (Special Class) of the Most Exalted Order of the White Elephant
  Knight Grand Cross (First Class) of the Most Noble Order of the Crown of Thailand
  The Ratana Varabhorn order of Merit
  King Rama V Royal Cypher Medal, Second Class
  King Rama VI Royal Cypher Medal, First Class
  King Rama VII Royal Cypher Medal, First Class
  Dushdi Mala

Ancestry

References

 Kitiyakara house
 http://freepages.genealogy.rootsweb.com/~royalty/thailand/i132.html
 http://freepages.genealogy.rootsweb.com/~royalty/thailand/i44.html
 Death of HRH Prince Kitiyakara Voralaksana

1874 births
1931 deaths
19th-century Thai people
19th-century Chakri dynasty
20th-century Chakri dynasty
Thai male Phra Ong Chao
Kitiyakara family
Knights Grand Cordon of the Order of Chula Chom Klao
Knights Grand Commander (Senangapati) of the Order of Rama
Knights of the Ratana Varabhorn Order of Merit
Alumni of Balliol College, Oxford
Children of Chulalongkorn
Ministers of Commerce of Thailand
Ministers of Finance of Thailand
Members of the Privy Council of Thailand
Sons of kings